Loricariichthys edentatus is a species of catfish in the family Loricariidae. It is native to South America, where it occurs in the lower Uruguay River basin in Entre Ríos Province in Argentina, and also in Brazil. It has no teeth on the premaxilla, a unique feature in the genus Loricariichthys. The species reaches 11.5 cm (4.5 inches) in standard length and is believed to be a facultative air-breather.

References

Further reading
Miquelarena, Amalia M., and Hugo L. López. "Considerations on the ichthyofauna of the Uruguay River Basin: Hemiancistrus fuliginosus Cardoso & Malabarba, 1999 (Loricariidae: Ancistrinae)." Journal of Applied Ichthyology20.3 (2004): 234–237.
López, Hugo L., et al. "Biogeographical revision of Argentina (Andean and Neotropical Regions): an analysis using freshwater fishes." Journal of Biogeography 35.9 (2008): 1564–1579.
Rodríguez, Mónica Sonia. Sistemática y distribución geográfica de peces de la familia Loricariidae (Ostariophysi: siluriformes) de la Argentina, con especial referencia a la tribu Loricariini. Diss. Facultad de Ciencias Naturales y Museo, 2003.

Loricariini
Fish of South America
Taxa named by Roberto Esser dos Reis
Taxa named by Edson H.L. Pereira
Fish described in 2000